The Norfolk Island national netball team represent Norfolk Island in international netball.

The team's first tournament was at the 1993 South Pacific Mini Games held in Port Vila, Vanuatu. Their next known tournament was at 1999 South Pacific Games
where they were narrowly beaten by Vanuatu in the Bronze Medal playoff. The only other recorded competition's were the 2001 South Pacific Mini Games held in Kingston, Norfolk Island where they finished sixth,  and at the 2007 Pacific Games and 2019 Pacific Games where they finished seventh.

The squad for the 2019 Pacific Games:
Michell Dowling, Emily Ryves, Suzanne Evans, Candice Nobbs, Alana Christian, Lara Bigg, Erin Christian, Rianna Christian, Jaimie Christensen, Mareeva Evans, Tahlia Evans, Bekki Meers, Myka Quintal, Kelly Schmitz, Kylie Sterling and Paige Adams.

Competitive history

Test match results

See also

Sport in Norfolk Island
Netball in Australia

References

External links
 Official webpage

National netball teams of Oceania
National sports teams of Norfolk Island